Iwakura-ike Dam is an earthfill dam located in Tokushima prefecture in Japan. The dam is used for irrigation. The catchment area of the dam is 10.7 km2. The dam impounds about 1  ha of land when full and can store 101 thousand cubic meters of water. The construction of the dam was started on 1930 and completed in 1932.

References

Dams in Tokushima Prefecture
1932 establishments in Japan